NGC 700 is a lenticular galaxy located 200 million light-years away in the constellation Andromeda. NGC 700 was discovered by astronomer Bindon Stoney on October 28, 1850. It is also a member of Abell 262.

The galaxy PGC 6924 is often misidentified as NGC 700.

See also
 List of NGC objects (1–1000)

References

External links
 

700
6928
Andromeda (constellation)
Astronomical objects discovered in 1850
Lenticular galaxies
Abell 262